Jordan Valley High School is a public high school in Jordan Valley, Oregon, United States.

Academics
In 2008, 86% of the school's seniors received a high school diploma. Of seven students, six graduated and one dropped out.

References

High schools in Malheur County, Oregon
Public middle schools in Oregon
Public high schools in Oregon